Anabela Chan is a London-based jewelry designer. Born in Hong Kong into 3 generations of film directors and cinematographers, Anabela grew up in London and Paris. She first graduated from UCL with a BSc in Architecture. She worked with Architect Lord Richard Rogers before designing prints and embroidery for Alexander McQueen and All Saints. She then returned to school and received her Master of Arts in Jewellery Design from the Royal College of Art. During her honeymoon in Sri Lanka she visited a mine and was shocked to see the working conditions. After that experience, she started to use laboratory grown synthesized and simulated gemstones. Anabela uses a range of sustainable materials such as recycled aluminium from soda cans in her jewellery.  

Anabela finds her inspirations from her extensive travels to the exotic and the orient; collecting gems and treasures along the way from local markets, nature and the intriguing people she meets. Through an alchemy of precious, natural and man-made materials Anabela combines elegant sculptural forms with dream-like romanticism and thought provoking narratives. 

Chan's jewelry designs were worn by Lady Gaga at the premiere of the movie A Star is Born in 2018 and by Zoë Kravitz at the 2019 Met Gala. Her work has also been worn by Julia Roberts, Anne Hathaway, Taylor Swift, Rihanna, Halle Berry, Zendaya, Emma Watson and Mariah Carey. Beyoncé wore Anabela Chan Jewels in her 'Black Is King' 

Anabela was named by Harper's Bazaar UK as "The Jewelry Designer you need to know now" and has awards from Vogue Talents and The British Goldsmiths' Crafts and Designs Council. Anabela Chan is awarded as Walpole's British Luxury Brand of Tomorrow in 2020, and The 50 Most Influential People in British Luxury in 2022.

She opened her first stand alone boutique in London Piccadilly’s Ham Yard Hotel in 2014, with a new Flagship at the iconic 35B Sloane Street in August 2020.  In 2021, Anabela became a Visiting Lecturer at the Royal College of Art.

References 

Jewellery designers
Hong Kong people
Alumni of the Royal College of Art
People from London
Living people
Year of birth missing (living people)